CPIC may refer to:
 Crime Prevention and Information Center
 Canadian Police Information Centre
 Cancer Prevention Institute of California
 Capital Planning and Investment Control
 China Pacific Insurance Company
 China Power Investment Corporation
 Citizens Property Insurance Corporation, Florida insurance agency
 Clinical Pharmacogenetics Implementation Consortium
 Coalition Press Information Center
 Common Programming Interface for Communications
 Construction Project Information Committee

es:CPIC
fr:CPIC